Sphaerotheca maskeyi is a species of frog in the family Ranidae found in Nepal and possibly Bhutan and India. Its natural habitats are subtropical or tropical moist lowland forests, subtropical or tropical seasonally wet or flooded lowland grassland, swamps, intermittent freshwater lakes, and freshwater marshes.

References

Sphaerotheca (frog)
Taxonomy articles created by Polbot
Amphibians described in 1998